Dragovići may refer to:

 Dragovići (Hadžići), a village near Hadžići, Bosnia and Herzegovina
 Dragovići (Novo Goražde), a village near Novo Goražde, Bosnia and Herzegovina
 Dragovići, Vareš, a village near Vareš, Bosnia and Herzegovina
 , a village near Vrbovsko, Croatia

See also
Dragović (surname), a South Slavic surname
Dragovic (disambiguation)
Dragovich (disambiguation)
Drago (disambiguation)